The Canon P (P for Populaire) was a rangefinder camera produced by Canon Inc., compatible with the Leica M39 screw mount (LTM). It was introduced in March 1959 and was marketed as a low-cost sister to the Canon VI-L. A black version was also introduced, which today is quite rare. The Canon P is the predecessor to the Canon 7 rangefinder.

External links

 Canon P at the Canon Camera Museum

Canon rangefinder cameras
Leica thread-mount cameras
Products introduced in 1959